Bradley Henry Gerstenfeld (born April 14, 1960), known professionally as Brad Garrett, is an American actor and stand-up comedian. Possessing a distinctive deep voice, he has appeared in numerous television and film roles in both live-action and animation mediums.

Garrett was initially successful as a stand-up comedian in the early 1980s. Taking advantage of that success in the late 1980s, Garrett began appearing in television and film, in minor and guest roles. His first major role was Robert Barone on the CBS sitcom Everybody Loves Raymond. The series debuted September 13, 1996, and ran for nine seasons. In 2002, he gave an Emmy-nominated and critically lauded performance as Jackie Gleason in the television film Gleason.

Garrett's film roles include Casper (1995), A Bug's Life (1998), An Extremely Goofy Movie (2000), Stuart Little 2 (2002), Finding Nemo (2003),  Garfield (2004), The Pacifier (2005), Ratatouille (2007), Tangled (2010), Hoodwinked Too! Hood vs. Evil (2011), The Incredible Burt Wonderstone (2013), Teenage Mutant Ninja Turtles: Out of the Shadows (2016), and Christopher Robin (2018). Garrett also played the leading role of Eddie Stark on the Fox sitcom 'Til Death from 2006 to 2010. From 2006 to 2014, he played the Easter Island Head in the Night at the Museum trilogy. From 2018 to 2020, he starred in the ABC sitcom Single Parents. In 2021, Garrett also helped create Disney+'s Big Shot with David E. Kelley and Dean Lorey. He is also known for voicing the Big Dog on 2 Stupid Dogs.

Garrett has won three Primetime Emmy Awards, with three other nominations. He is still prominent within stand-up comedy and owns a comedy club at the MGM Grand in Las Vegas, called Brad Garrett's Comedy Club, where he performs regularly.

Early life
Bradley Henry Garrett was born to Barbara and Alvin "Al" Gerstenfeld in Oxnard, California. He is Jewish. Garrett has two brothers, Jeff and Paul. He attended George Ellery Hale Middle School and graduated from El Camino Real High School, both in the Woodland Hills section of Los Angeles, California. Garrett attended UCLA for less than two months before dropping out to pursue his comedy career.

Career
Before comedy Garrett was known for being on the cover of ELO's eighth studio album Discovery. In the early 1980s, he started doing standup at various comedy clubs in Los Angeles, including The Improv in Hollywood and The Ice House in Pasadena. In 1984, he became the first $100,000 grand champion winner in the comedy category of the TV show Star Search. This led to his first appearance, at age 23, on The Tonight Show Starring Johnny Carson, making him one of the youngest comedians ever to perform on the show. His appearance with Carson brought Garrett more national attention, and soon he was appearing as an opening act for such headliners as Diana Ross and Liza Minnelli. He also opened in Las Vegas for Frank Sinatra, David Copperfield, Smokey Robinson, Sammy Davis, Jr., the Beach Boys, The Righteous Brothers and Julio Iglesias.

After achieving a strong measure of success with stand-up comedy, Garrett began performing on TV.  From 1985 to 1986, he was the voice of Hulk Hogan (in a voice similar to Rodney Dangerfield) for the cartoon series Hulk Hogan's Rock 'n Wrestling, He was featured on Family Feud during Ray Combs's tenure in a "Funny Men vs. Funny Women Week" during November sweeps. He also appeared for a week on the game show Super Password in 1987. He also appeared on Hollywood Squares including a moment when he impersonated Bill Cosby during a question about Jell-o. He then appeared in the short-lived summer comedy First Impressions (CBS, 1988), in which he was a divorced father who makes a living doing impressions, in a one-time spot as a bank loan officer on Roseanne (ABC), and The Pursuit of Happiness (NBC, 1995–96), in which he was the hero's gay best friend. Prior to these roles, Garrett had also had a minor part on Transformers, voicing the Decepticon base Trypticon in season three and as an ill-fated thug in Suicide Kings. He soon won the role of Ray Romano's brother Robert Barone on the long-running family-oriented comedy hit Everybody Loves Raymond, and in 1998, he and Romano appeared together in their respective roles on a Season 1 episode of The King of Queens, titled "Road Rayge", in which Robert is jealous of his brother spending so much time with Doug Heffernan (the main character played by Kevin James). Garrett has also made an appearance on The Fresh Prince of Bel-Air playing a hitman who attempts to kill Will Smith's character.

Garrett also works as a voice actor, such as on Mighty Ducks: The Animated Series, 2 Stupid Dogs, The Spooktacular New Adventures of Casper, Project Geeker, Biker Mice from Mars, Steven Spielberg Presents: Toonsylvania, A Bug's Life, Finding Nemo, Ratatouille, Asterix and the Vikings, Superman: The Animated Series,  and Justice League as Lobo.

His role on Everybody Loves Raymond won him five Emmy Award nominations, and the 2002, 2003 and 2005 Emmy Awards for Outstanding Supporting Actor in a Comedy Series.

In 1990, Garrett appeared as a semi-regular panelist on the revival of Match Game. On the May 2, 1996 episode of the sitcom Seinfeld, called "The Bottle Deposit", Garrett played a rogue auto mechanic who steals Jerry Seinfeld's car.

In 2003, he was also nominated for the Emmy Award for Outstanding Lead Actor in a Miniseries or Movie for Gleason. With his Raymond castmates, he won the 2003 Screen Actors Guild Award for Outstanding Performance by an Ensemble in a Comedy Series. He won the fifth season championship of Celebrity Poker Showdown, and played in the 2005, 2006 and 2007 World Series of Poker. Garrett was hoping to do a spin-off with his character Robert Barone from Everybody Loves Raymond when the show ended its nine-year run in 2005, but he withdrew in October 2005 due to inaction from CBS that led to a number of the writers from Raymond leaving and taking other jobs.

In 2005, Garrett appeared on Broadway playing Murray the Cop in the revival of Neil Simon's The Odd Couple with Nathan Lane and Matthew Broderick. He understudied Lane in the role of Oscar Madison, and substituted for him in January 2006, during Lane's illness. That same year, he starred in The Pacifier opposite Vin Diesel. In 2006, Fox network announced they would pick up a new sitcom called 'Til Death starring Garrett in the lead role. The plot revolves around a long married couple whose new next door neighbors are a pair of feisty newlyweds. Joely Fisher plays Garrett's wife in the series. He also appeared onstage on American Idol season six (2007) during judging on week 11, to which Ryan Seacrest said, "And the next person off American Idol is—Brad, you're out."

In the fall of 2008, Garrett starred in, and was the executive producer for, an online reality show called Dating Brad Garrett. In 2008, Garrett hosted a celebrity roast of Cheech & Chong, which was aired on TBS.

In 2009, Garrett entered the main event at the World Series of Poker, losing on the second day of the event. Garrett has starred in commercials for 7-Up, where he portrays a more happy, cheerful version of himself because of the soda.

In June 2010, he opened Brad Garrett's Comedy Club in the Tropicana Resort and Casino in Las Vegas. In December 2010, he was one of the narrators during performances of the Candlelight Processional at Epcot.

In June 2011, I Kid with Brad Garrett, a candid kids show, premiered on TLC. On December 12, 2011, Garrett closed his club at the Tropicana. He started a new club with the same name across the street at the MGM Grand, and is active as of April 2016.

In the summer of 2013, Garrett played Chug in the film Planes, marking the fourth time he starred in a film with John Ratzenberger. In the fall of 2013, Garrett played a recurring character in The Crazy Ones. In May 2016, he was confirmed to appear as the voice of Krang, in the sci-fi action comedy film Teenage Mutant Ninja Turtles: Out of the Shadows.

In November 2016, Garrett portrayed Frankenstein's monster in a Christmas commercial for Apple's iPhone 7. As of 2017, the ad has received over seven million views. In 2018, Garrett voiced the character Eeyore in the live-action film Christopher Robin, based on Disney's Winnie the Pooh franchise, and in a cameo in the animated film Ralph Breaks the Internet. He previously voiced the character in the 1995 video game Disney's Animated Storybook: Winnie the Pooh and the Honey Tree.

As of 2021, he portrays a character named Tony Bolognavich in Jimmy Johns's commercials.

When asked whether he would do a revival of Everybody Loves Raymond, he stated:You know. There's no show without the parents. That's really the bottom line. Doris and Peter were such a huge part of the show. I miss them but some things you don't go back to, you know. We could never recreate that.

Personal life

In 1998, Garrett proposed to his then-girlfriend, Jill Diven, on the set of Everybody Loves Raymond, and they were married on May 18, 1999; together they have two children, a son and a daughter. Garrett and Diven separated in 2005, and Diven filed for divorce in July 2006. The divorce was finalized in November 2007.

In 2008, he began dating actress IsaBeall Quella, whom he met at a Vose art gallery in Boston. They were engaged in December 2015. The couple married on November 11, 2021.

Garrett stated in an interview in May 2015, that as his acting career began, he won a battle against alcoholism, later admitting he was a "high-functioning alcoholic".

Filmography

Film

Television

Video games

References

External links

 
 Brad Garrett's Comedy Club
 
 

1960 births
Living people
20th-century American comedians
20th-century American male actors
21st-century American comedians
21st-century American male actors
American male comedians
American male film actors
American male stage actors
American male television actors
American male video game actors
American male voice actors
American poker players
Comedians from California
El Camino Real High School alumni
Jewish American comedians
Jewish American male actors
Jewish American male comedians
Lee Strasberg Theatre and Film Institute alumni
Male actors from California
People from Hidden Hills, California
People from Woodland Hills, Los Angeles
21st-century American Jews